Ahmed Said (born 1 January 1962) is an Egyptian swimmer. He competed in four events at the 1984 Summer Olympics.

References

1962 births
Living people
Egyptian male swimmers
Olympic swimmers of Egypt
Swimmers at the 1984 Summer Olympics
Place of birth missing (living people)